Stanley Allan Lloyd JP (8 December 1889 – 28 April 1967) was an Australian politician.

He was born at St Leonards in Sydney to salesman William Lloyd and Sarah Eliza, née Beard. After attending Fort Street School he became an accountant. On 29 August 1914 he married Florence Fryer, with whom he had three children. An Alderman of Enfield Municipal Council from 1928 to 1938, he served as mayor from 1930 to 1935. In 1932 he was elected to the New South Wales Legislative Assembly as the United Australia Party member for Concord. During his time in the Assembly he became known as an opponent of Premier and party leader Bertram Stevens, and he was involved in Stevens' overthrow in 1939. Lloyd also served as the first chairman of Sydney County Council Electricity Undertaking from 1935 to 1936. He was defeated in 1941. Lloyd died in Sydney in 1967.

References

 

1889 births
1967 deaths
United Australia Party members of the Parliament of New South Wales
Members of the New South Wales Legislative Assembly
Politicians from Sydney
Mayors of places in New South Wales
Australian accountants
20th-century Australian politicians
Councillors of Sydney County Council